A-Power Energy Generation Systems is a provider of distributed generation systems in China. In 2008, A-Power entered the wind energy market and has built the largest wind turbine manufacturing facility, located in Shenyang, Liaoning Province, China, with technologies licensed from German FUHRLÄNDER AG and Denmark-based Norwin, and a total annual production capacity of 1,125 MW.

External links

 Company website

Engineering companies of China
Companies based in Shenyang
Chinese brands